Jessie Chandler (born August 16, 1968) is an American author of mystery and humorous caper fiction, most of which is about lesbian protagonists. Her work includes the Shay O'Hanlon Caper Series, many short stories, and other novels. Chandler has presented talks about the craft of writing, serves as a mentor to many up-and-coming writers, and is a contributing member of The Golden Crown Literary Society, Sisters in Crime, and serves on the board of Mystery Writers of America.


Personal life 

Chandler was born in Grantsburg, Wisconsin, and raised primarily by a single mother, her father having died before she was born. She spent part of her early life with her grandparents in Siren, Wisconsin, then lived with her mother, a school teacher, in the Minneapolis – Saint Paul metro area until taking off to attend St. Cloud State University in St. Cloud, Minnesota, where she received a bachelor's degree in journalism. She met her long-time partner, Betty Chandler, over two decades ago, and they were finally able to marry in Iowa in 2010.

A former police officer, Chandler has worked in management at both Borders Books and True Colors Bookstore in Minneapolis, previously known as Amazon Bookstore Cooperative. Currently she spends her days writing and running a small, home-based business.

Writing career 

Chandler is a member of the new breed of lesbian authors writing Mystery fiction who are not constrained by topic, content, or mainstream opinion. Her caper crime fiction falls into the same subgenre as the work of noted lesbian authors such as Elizabeth Sims, Ann McMan, and Joan Opyr. As her writing career has gathered steam, Chandler has become a mentor and coach to many new and aspiring writers, especially through her work at The Golden Crown Literary Society where she has judged the literary awards, served on conference panels, and provided T-shirts for the yearly conference. She is also a member of Sisters in Crime and Mystery Writers of America, for which she critiques unpublished authors eager for assistance. For 2021-22, she serves on the Board of Mystery Writers of America

A Mystery Lovers Bookstore review called the first novel a "winner" and "a delightful romp." Lavender (magazine) said: "Coffee, romance, murder, and dog all make for Minnesota nice-nice."  In a pre-pub review, Library Journal listed the new book as "Truly Wacky," and Ellen Hart said: "Bingo Barge Murder is a solid first entry in the Shay O'Hanlon mystery series. Chandler writes with a wonderful sense of place, plenty of humor, and a crisp pace. The best part for me were the characters, which were so richly drawn that they felt like instant friends. This is a great read from the very first page!"

Awards and recognition
 2012 Golden Crown Ann Bannon Popular Choice Award Winner for "Bingo Barge Murder"
 2012 Golden Crown Literary Society Finalist for Best Mystery/Thriller for "Bingo Barge Murder"
 2013 Independent Publisher Book Award Winner (IPPY): GLBT Fiction for "Hide & Snake Murder"
 2013 Golden Crown Literary Society Goldie Winner for Best Mystery/Thriller for "Hide & Snake Murder"
 2013 Golden Crown Ann Bannon Popular Choice Award Finalist for "Hide & Snake Murder"
 2014 American Fiction Book Awards Winner (formerly: USA Best Book Awards) for LGBTQ Fiction for "Chip Off the Ice Block Murder"
 2014 American Fiction Book Awards Finalist (formerly: USA Best Book Awards) for LGBTQ Fiction for "Hide & Snake Murder"
 2014 American Fiction Book Awards Finalist (formerly: USA Best Book Awards) for LGBTQ Fiction for "Pickle in the Middle Murder"
 2014 Golden Crown Ann Bannon Popular Choice Award Finalist for "Pickle in the Middle Murder"
 2015 American Fiction Book Awards Winner (formerly: USA Best Book Awards) for LGBTQ Fiction for "Operation Stop Hate"
 2015 Golden Crown Ann Bannon Popular Choice Award Finalist for "Chip Off the Ice Block Murder"
 2016 Golden Crown Literary Society Goldie Winner for Best Anthology with Lori L. Lake "Lesbians on the Loose: Crime Writers on the Lam"
 2016 Golden Crown Ann Bannon Popular Choice Award Finalist for "Operation Stop Hate"
 2017 Golden Crown Literary Society Finalist for Best Mystery/Thriller for "Blood Money Murder"
 2017 Lambda Literary Award Finalist for Best Lesbian Mystery for "Blood Money Murder"
 2020 American Fiction Book Awards: LGBTQ Fiction Winner for "Quest for Redemption"

Selected works

Novels
 Bingo Barge Murder: A Shay O'Hanlon Caper (2011)
 Hide and Snake Murder: A Shay O'Hanlon Caper (2012)
 Pickle in the Middle Murder: A Shay O'Hanlon Caper (2013)
 Chip Off the Old Ice Block: A Shay O'Hanlon Caper (2014)
 Operation Stop Hate: Book 1 in the Operation Series (2015)
 Blood Money Murder: A Shay O'Hanlon Caper (2016)
 Quest for Redemption (2020)
 Shanghai Murder: A Shay O'Hanlon Caper (forthcoming)

Anthologies edited
 Lesbians on the Loose: Crime Writers on the Lam, edited with Lori L. Lake (2015)

Anthologies containing Jessie Chandler's short fiction
 "Fury" in Women in Uniform: Medics & Soldiers & Cops, Oh My! (2010)
 "Silent Night, Deadly Night" in Why Did Santa Leave a Body: Yuletide Tales of Murder and Mayhem (2010)
 "Sweet Spring Revenge" in Once Upon a Crime (2011)
 "Sweet Spring Revenge" in Lesbians on the Loose: Crime Writers on the Lam, edited with Lori L. Lake (2015)
 "Red Velvet Cake to Die For" in Cooked to Death: Tales of Crime & Cookery (2016)
 "Evolution of an Art Thief" in The Law Game (2016)
 "The Purple Monkey" in Happily Ever After: Romantic Stories by Bella Authors (2016)
 "The Pink Pussy" in Women in Sports: Hot, Sweaty, Sexy, Oh My! (2016)
 "Who Knew" in Conference Call (2017)
 "Mirror Image" in Learning Curve: An Anthology of Lessons Learned (2018)
 "The Secret Adversary" in Blood Work: Remembering Gary Shulze from Once Upon a Crime" (2018)
 "A Rocky Road at Interstate Park" in Down to the River (2019)
 "Send Out the Clowns" in Save the Date: A Romantic Anthology'' (forthcoming, June 2021)

References

External links 
 Official website
  Publisher's home page
 Independent Publishers Book Awards (IPPYs)
 Lavender Magazine
  The Loft Literary Center
  Golden Crown Literary Society
 American Fiction Book Awards (formerly USA Best Book Awards)
  Kirkus Reviews

1968 births
Living people
21st-century American novelists
American mystery writers
American women novelists
American lesbian writers
Women mystery writers
Novelists from Wisconsin
American LGBT novelists
LGBT people from Wisconsin
21st-century American women writers
People from Grantsburg, Wisconsin
People from Burnett County, Wisconsin